Caroline Smith (born 4 March 1958 in Coatbridge, Lanark) professionally known as Caroline Ashley, is a Scottish former television actress who is best known for playing Fiona Ryder (née Cunningham) in Take the High Road from the first-ever episode in 1980 until 1993, one of the programme's longest-running characters. She was educated at the Queen Margaret College in Edinburgh and, aged 21, joined the original cast of Take the High Road when filming began in 1979. It was her first professional engagement.

References

Bibliography

External links
 

1958 births
Living people
People from Coatbridge
Scottish soap opera actresses
Scottish television actresses
Take the High Road
Alumni of Queen Margaret University